is a railway station in the city of Kurihara, Miyagi Prefecture, Japan, operated by East Japan Railway Company (JR East).

Lines
Semine Station is served by the Tōhoku Main Line, and is located 407.8 rail kilometers from the official starting point of the line at Tokyo Station.

Station layout
Semine Station has a side platform and one island platform connected to the station building by a footbridge. The station has a "Midori no Madoguchi" staffed ticket office.

Platforms

History
Semine Station opened on April 16, 1890. From 1921-1968, the station also served the Senboku Railway. The station was absorbed into the JR East network upon the privatization of the Japanese National Railways (JNR) on April 1, 1987.

Passenger statistics
In fiscal 2018, the station was used by an average of 488 passengers daily (boarding passengers only).

See also
 List of Railway Stations in Japan

References

External links

  

Railway stations in Miyagi Prefecture
Tōhoku Main Line
Railway stations in Japan opened in 1890
Kurihara, Miyagi
Stations of East Japan Railway Company